The 2021 Berkeley Tennis Club Challenge was a professional women's tennis tournament played on outdoor hard courts. It was the third edition of the tournament which was part of the 2021 ITF Women's World Tennis Tour. It took place in Berkeley, California, United States between 27 September and 3 October 2021.

Singles main-draw entrants

Seeds

 1 Rankings are as of 20 September 2021.

Other entrants
The following players received wildcards into the singles main draw:
  Reese Brantmeier
  Ellie Douglas
  Victoria Duval
  Paola Expósito Díaz Delgado

The following player received entry using a protected ranking:
  Louisa Chirico

The following player received entry as a special exempt:
  Kayla Day

The following players received entry from the qualifying draw:
  Alexandra Bozovic
  Sophie Chang
  Jada Hart
  Haruka Kaji
  Maria Kozyreva
  Hiroko Kuwata
  Maegan Manasse
  Emma Navarro

Champions

Singles

  Usue Maitane Arconada def.  Marcela Zacarías, 6–1, 6–3

Doubles

  Sophie Chang /  Angela Kulikovdef.  Liang En-shuo /  Lu Jiajing, 6–4, 6–3

References

External links
 2021 Berkeley Tennis Club Challenge at ITFtennis.com
 Official website 

2021 ITF Women's World Tennis Tour
2021 in American tennis
September 2021 sports events in the United States
October 2021 sports events in the United States